The women's 100 metres event at the 1998 Commonwealth Games was held on 16–17 September on National Stadium, Bukit Jalil.

Medalists

Results

Heats
Qualification: First 3 of each heat (Q) and the next four fastest qualified for the semifinals.

Wind:Heat 1: 0.0 m/s, Heat 2: 0.0 m/s, Heat 3: 0.0 m/s, Heat 4: -0.1 m/s

Semifinals
Qualification: First 4 of each heat qualified directly (Q) for the final.

Wind:Heat 1: -0.6 m/s, Heat 2: -0.1 m/s

Final
Wind: -0.3 m/s

References

100
1998
1998 in women's athletics